A duchy, also called a dukedom, is a medieval country, territory, fief, or domain ruled by a duke or duchess, a ruler  hierarchically second to the king or queen in Western European tradition.

There once existed an important difference between "sovereign dukes" and dukes who were ordinary noblemen throughout Europe. Some historic duchies were sovereign in areas that would become part of nation-states only during the modern era, such as happened in Germany (once a federal empire) and Italy (previously a unified kingdom). In contrast, others were subordinate districts of those kingdoms that had unified either partially or completely during the medieval era, such as France, Spain, Sicily, Naples, and the Papal States.

Examples
In France, several duchies existed in the medieval period, including Normandy, Burgundy, Brittany, and Aquitaine.

The medieval German stem duchies (literally "tribal duchy," the official title of its ruler being Herzog or "duke") were associated with the Frankish Kingdom and corresponded with the areas of settlement of the major Germanic tribes.  They formed the nuclei of the major feudal states that comprised the early era of the Holy Roman Empire of the German nation (961-1806; in German: Heiliges Römisches Reich Deutscher Nation). These were Schwaben (Swabia, mainly the present-day German state of Baden-Württemberg), Bayern (Bavaria), and Sachsen (Saxony) in pre-Carolingian times, to which Franken (Franconia, at present the northern part of the German state of Bavaria) and Lothringen (Lorraine, nowadays mostly part of France) were added in post-Carolingian times. As mentioned above, such a duke was styled Herzog (literally "the one who is leading [the troops]").

In medieval England, duchies associated with the territories of Lancashire and Cornwall were created, with certain powers and estates of land accruing to their dukes. The Duchy of Lancaster was created in 1351 but became merged with the Crown when, in 1399, Henry Bolingbroke, Duke of Lancaster, ascended the throne of England as Henry IV.  Nowadays, the Duchy of Lancaster always belongs to the sovereign and its revenue is the Privy Purse.  The Duchy of Cornwall was created in 1337 and held successively by the Dukes of Cornwall, who were also heirs to the throne. Nowadays, the Duchy of Cornwall belongs to the sovereign's heir apparent, if there is one: it reverts to the Crown in the absence of an heir apparent and is automatically conferred to the heir apparent upon birth.  These duchies today have mostly lost any non-ceremonial political role, but generate their holders' private income.  During the Wars of the Roses, the Duke of York made a successful entry into the City of York, by merely claiming no harm and that it was his right to possess "his duchy of York."  Any and all feudal duchies that made up the patchwork of England have since been absorbed within the Royal Family.  Other than Cornwall and Lancaster, British royal dukedoms are titular and do not include landholdings.  Non-royal dukedoms are associated with ducal property, but this is meant as the duke's private property, with no other feudal privileges attached.  At present, all independent (i.e., sovereign) duchies have disappeared.

List of duchies

Baltic provinces and governorates

 Duchy of Courland and Semigallia
 Duchy of Estonia (disambiguation)
 Duchy of Livonia
 United Baltic Duchy

Croatia

 Lower Pannonia
 Duchy of Croatia
 Pagania
 Poljica duchy

Denmark

 Duchy of Schleswig
 Duchy of Holstein (formally part of the Holy Roman Empire)

England

 Duchy of Cornwall
 Duchy of Lancaster

France

 Duchy of Anjou
 Duchy of Aquitaine
 Duchy of Berry
 Duchy of Bourbon
 Duchy of Brittany
 Duchy of Burgundy
Duchy of Gascony
Duchy of Guyenne
 Duchy of Normandy
 Duchy of Orléans
 Duchy of Lorraine

Georgia 

 Duchy of Aragvi
 Duchy of Kldekari
 Duchy of Ksani
 Duchy of Tskhumi
 Duchy of Racha

Holy Roman Empire

 Duchy of Alsace (in English also ‘Alsatia’)
 Duchy of Austria (later Archduchy of Austria, in German: Erzherzogtum Österreich)
 Duchy of Bavaria
 Duchy of Bohemia
 Duchy of Brabant
 Duchy of Bremen
 Duchy of Brunswick
 Duchy of Carinthia
 Duchy of Carniola
 Duchy of Franconia
 Duchy of Gelders
 Duchy of Holstein
 Duchy of Jülich
 Duchy of Lauenburg
 Duchy of Limburg
 Duchy of Upper Lorraine
 Duchy of Lower Lorraine
 Duchy of Luxemburg (a Grand Duchy since 1815; see above)
 Duchy of Magdeburg
 Duchy of Mecklenburg
 Duchy of Oldenburg
 Duchy of Pomerania
 Duchy of Salzburg
 Duchy of Savoy
 Duchy of Saxe-Altenburg
 Duchy of Saxe-Coburg and Gotha
 Duchy of Saxe-Meiningen
 Duchy of Saxony
 Duchy of Styria
 Duchy of Swabia
 Duchy of Thuringia
 Duchy of Westphalia
 Duchy of Württemberg

The following duchies were part of the medieval Kingdom of Italy, which itself was part of the Holy Roman Empire:

 Duchy of Milan
 Duchy of Mantua
Duchy of Sabbioneta
Duchy of Montferrat
Duchy of Guastalla
Duchy of Modena and Reggio
Duchy of Mirandola
Duchy of Massa and Carrara

Naples

 Duchy of Acerenza
 Duchy of Apulia
 Duchy of Sora

Papal States (Holy See)

Duchy of Ferrara
Duchy of Urbino
Duchy of Camerino
Duchy of Castro
Duchy of Parma

Poland

 Duchy of Poland
Duchy of Prussia
 Duchy of Warsaw

Slovakia
Duchy of Nitra

Spain

 Dukedoms of Spain

Sweden

All provinces of Sweden have the right to have a ducal coronet in their arms. The king gives princes and princesses ducal titles of them. The current such royal duchies are:
Västergötland
Värmland
Gästrikland and Hälsingland combined
Östergötland
Gotland
Ångermanland
Skåne
Södermanland
Dalarna
Blekinge
Halland
Uppland

Crusader states
 Duchy of Athens
 Duchy of the Archipelago
 Duchy of Neopatras
 Duchy of Philippopolis

Other current or historical duchies
 Duchy of the Franks
 Duchy of Lower Pannonia
 Duchy of Gascony
 Duchy of Limburg
 Duchy of Livonia
 Duchy of Vasconia
 Duchy of Pakualaman
 Duchy of Mangkunegaran

See also

Constitutional status of Cornwall
Duchies in England

Fictional duchies

 Underland, ruled by Underbeit, on The Venture Brothers
 Duchy of Atreides from the Dune series by Frank Herbert
Soleanna from Sonic the Hedgehog
 Duchy of Dollet (from Final Fantasy VIII)
 Grand Duchy of Jeuno (from Final Fantasy XI)
 Duchy of Grand Fenwick
 Borogravia, Quirm (from the Discworld series)
Duchy of Sto Helit, in the kingdom of Sto Lat (from the Discworld series)
 The Six Duchies (from The Farseer Trilogy and Tawny Man Trilogy by Robin Hobb)
 Zeon (from the Mobile Suit Gundam series, also sometimes translated as a Principality, as the Japanese language does not distinguish between the two)
 Erat, Asturia, Mimbre, Wacune (from the Belgariad series)
 Crydee, Yabon, Krondor, Olasko, Rillanon, Ran, Rodez, Salador, The Sunset Isles (from the Riftwar saga)
 Kolvir, ruled by main character Prince Corwin in The Chronicles of Amber
 Freid (from The Vision of Escaflowne series)
 Cagliostro from Lupin III: The Castle of Cagliostro
 Duchy of Nuts from Adventure Time with Finn & Jake
 Duchy of Harrington from the Honorverse
Duchy of Toussaint, from The Witcher series.
Duchy of Serkonos, from Dishonored 2
Duchy of Urnst, from the Dungeons & Dragons Greyhawk Campaign Setting.

References

External links

The Duchy of Cornwall official site

Monarchy
Types of administrative division